San Klang may refer to several places in Thailand:

San Klang, Phan
San Klang, San Kamphaeng
San Klang, San Pa Tong